Fusco is an Italian surname. Notable people with the surname include:

 Alfonso Maria Fusco, Italian Roman Catholic priest
 Angela Fusco, Canadian actress
 Angelo Fusco, Provisional Irish Republican Army member
 Antonio Fusco, Italian professional football player
 Brandon Fusco, American football player
 Cecilia Fusco (born 1933), Italian operatic soprano, daughter of Giovanni
 Coco Fusco, American artist
 Cosimo Fusco, Italian actor
 Daniel Fusco (born 1975), lead pastor of Crossroads Community Church in Vancouver, Washington
 Emiliano Fusco, Argentine football midfielder
 Fusco (footballer), born João Carlos Proença Filipe, former Portuguese footballer
 Gian Carlo Fusco, Italian writer, journalist, screenwriter and actor
 Giovanni Fusco (1906–1968), Italian composer, pianist and conductor, brother of Tarcisio
 Joe Fusco, American head football coach
 John Fusco, American screenwriter
 John Fusco (Connecticut politician), American Republican Party politician
 John Fusco (New York politician), American lawyer, jurist, and politician
 Lionel Fusco, fictional character in the TV series Person of Interest
 Luca Fusco, Italian footballer
 Maria Fusco, Belfast born writer, lecturer, art critic, and events organiser
 Mark Fusco, American ice hockey player
 Nicola Fusco, Italian mathematician
 Onofrio Fusco, Italian professional football player and coach
 Paul Fusco, American voice actor
 Paul Fusco (photographer) (1930–2020), American photojournalist
 Raffaele Di Fusco, Italian professional football coach and a former player
 Scott Fusco, American ice hockey player
 Tarcisio Fusco (1904–?), Italian composer of film scores, brother of Giovanni
 Blessed Tommaso Maria Fusco, Italian Roman Catholic priest

See also
The Fusco Brothers, American comic strip by J. C. Duffy

Fuschi, a variant of the surname "Fusco"

Italian-language surnames